Jeff Cummins (born May 25, 1969) is a former Canadian football defensive lineman and is the head coach for Acadia University's football team, the Acadia Axemen. Cummins became Acadia's head coach in 2003 and has led the team to first-place finishes in 2005, 2006, 2011, 2012, 2017, and 2019.

Professional football
From 1994-2000, Cummins played in the Canadian Football League for the Las Vegas Posse, Toronto Argonauts, Ottawa Rough Riders, and the Hamilton Tiger-Cats. From 2001-2003, he played in the Arena Football League with the Toronto Phantoms, Arizona Rattlers, and the Georgia Force. He was famous for his flamboyant sack dances, which he usually deployed after sacking the opposing team's quarterback.

College football
From 1990-1992, Cummins played college football for the Oregon Ducks. From 1988-1989, Cummins played junior college football for El Camino College and was a 1st Team All American as a defensive end and was voted onto the 1980s Jr College All-Decade team.

References

External links
Acadia profile
ArenaFan profile

1969 births
Arizona Rattlers players
Canadian football defensive linemen
Georgia Force players
Hamilton Tiger-Cats players
Las Vegas Posse players
Living people
Oregon Ducks football players
Ottawa Rough Riders players
People from San Pedro, Los Angeles
Toronto Argonauts players
Toronto Phantoms players
Players of American football from Los Angeles
Acadia Axemen football coaches